Alejandro Otero Lárez (born January 2, 1974, in Caracas, Venezuela) is a Venezuelan model and actor who won the title of Mister Venezuela on 1999.

Otero was the official representative of Venezuela for the Mister World 2000 pageant in Scotland, on October 13, 2000, when he placed in the Top 10 Semifinalists.

Alejandro graduated as a dentist from the Universidad Central de Venezuela. He later went on to win the Mister Venezuela 1999 title.  His acting career took off as he took roles in Venezuelan telenovelas, and in 2006 he participated in Date con Todo a celebrity dancing show on Radio Caracas Television.

Participation in Soap Opera:

” La Reina del Flow ( in colombia for Caracol TV)
" La Mujer de Judas " (In Venezuela, RCTV)
" La Cuaima " (In Venezuela, RCTV)
" Ser Bonita no basta " (In Venezuela, RCTV)
" Made in Cartagena" Bazurto (In Colombia, CMO Producciones for Caracol TV)

References

External links

Mister World official website
Monarcas de Venezuela Blog
Alejandro Otero at Modelsoftheworld.com
Miss Venezuela La Nueva Era MB

Living people
1974 births
Male beauty pageant winners
RCTV personalities
Venezuelan male actors
Venezuelan male models
Central University of Venezuela alumni
Venezuelan dentists